Draper is a city in Salt Lake and Utah counties in the U.S. state of Utah, about  south of Salt Lake City along the Wasatch Front. As of the 2020 census, the population is 51,017, up from 7,143 in 1990.

Draper is part of two metropolitan areas; the Salt Lake County portion is in the Salt Lake City metropolitan area, while the Utah County portion is in the Provo-Orem metropolitan area.

The Utah State Prison is in Draper, near Point of the Mountain, alongside Interstate 15. Gary Gilmore's execution occurred on 17 January 1977. The Utah Legislature voted to relocate the state prison to Draper in 2014 and in 2015 approved the Salt Lake City location the prison relocation commission recommended. The Draper Prison will close in 2022. Inmates will be moved to a new prison facility in Salt Lake City; the new prison is slated for completion in mid-2022.

Draper has two UTA TRAX stations (Draper Town Center, 12300/12400 South and Kimball's Lane 11800 South) as well as one on the border with Sandy (Crescent View 11400 South). A FrontRunner commuter rail station serves the city's west side. The city has around 5 FLEX bus routes connecting neighboring communities and two bus routes to Lehi Frontrunner Station and River/Herriman, connecting at Draper Town Center and the Draper Frontrunner Stations.

The city is home of 1-800 Contacts and a large eBay campus.

History
In the fall of 1849, Ebenezer Brown brought cattle to graze along the mountain stream of South Willow Creek. The next spring, Ebenezer moved with his wife Phebe ("Phebe Draper Palmer Brown") and their family to settle in Sivogah, the Native American name for the area, which means "Willows." By the end of 1850, residents of the small settlement consisted of Ebenezer Brown and his three children (by a prior marriage), Phebe Draper Palmer Brown and her two children (by a prior marriage), and Phebe's brother, William Draper Jr. and his large family numbering about fifteen. Consequently, by the end of the settlement's first year, most residents were members of the Draper Family, and William Draper Jr. was soon called to be the presiding elder for the Church of Jesus Christ of Latter-day Saints in the area. During this time, the Drapers mainly farmed, and Ebenezer Brown ranched and sold cattle to immigrants heading to the gold fields of California along what became the Mormon Road. More settlers moved to Draper in the next few years. Later the area was called South Willow Creek. By 1852, 20 families lived along the creek. In 1854, the first post office was established with the name Draperville in recognition of William Draper Jr. and its other Draper residents. The town's name in later years was shortened to Draper. (William Draper Sr., father of both William and Phebe Draper, who was older at the time of his family's settlement of Draper is buried in the town cemetery.)

Hostilities with the Native Americans began in 1854, and a fort was established where the local settlers lived during the winters of 1855 and 1856. The fort was never completed, as the feared hostilities did not materialize, and its former location is now the site of the Draper Historical Park and the aptly-named Fort Street.

In the 1940s, Draper was known as the "Egg Basket of Utah." Eggs produced in Draper were marketed from coast to coast, and the co-op furnished eggs for the military troops in the South Pacific during WWII. The poultry business was the single most important economic industry in Draper during this time. One large poultry farm was the Washburn Poultry Farm, run by Bruce D. Washburn, with over 10,000 chickens during the 1950s.

Draper remained a small farming community until the late 1990s when its population began growing exponentially from 7,257 in 1990 to an estimated 47,710 in 2018.

Draper was incorporated as a city in 1978.

Geography

Draper City is nestled in the far southeast corner of the Salt Lake Valley, with the Wasatch Mountain Range on the east and the Traverse Ridge Mountain on the south. At the Point of the Mountain, Draper is known for being one of the most popular and best wind areas in the country for hang gliding and paragliding.

Draper lies roughly midway between Salt Lake City and Provo. Draper is bordered by Riverton and Bluffdale to the west, South Jordan to the northwest, Sandy to the north, Alpine to the southeast, Highland to the south, and Lehi to the southwest.

Climate

Draper's climate is roughly identical to other Salt Lake City suburbs. However, due to being further away from the Great Salt Lake, varied elevation, and from the downtown urban heat island effect, Draper experiences a slightly drier winter and more extremes in temperatures.

The average temperatures in winter and summer, respectively, are 30 °F to 50 °F, and 80 °F to 100 °F. Springs are usually mild and wet, while fall can sometimes become an Indian summer with drier weather. Monsoonal moisture from the south usually brings afternoon thunderstorms in July and August. Draper falls on the border of the humid continental/subtropical climatic zones and is technically a cool/warm semi-arid desert environment, but with summer monsoonal moisture. Snow usually falls regularly from November through March.

Demographics

2010 Census Information

Economy

Draper is home to the tech call center of PGP Corporation, the call center of Musician's Friend, and the headquarters of 1-800 Contacts, Control4, and HealthEquity. Draper is also home to Utah's first IKEA, which opened in 2007.

The Church of Jesus Christ of Latter-day Saints constructed a temple in Draper that was dedicated on March 20, 2009.

Top employers
According to the City's Popular Annual Financial Report for the fiscal year ending June 30, 2018, the top employers in the city are:

Local media

Newspapers, Magazines, and Newsletter

The Draper City Journal is a tabloid-style newspaper covering local government, schools, sports, and features. Delivered to homes directly monthly by mail.

Draper City publishes a bi-monthly city newsletter entitled "Draper Forward." This publication is mailed to all of the residents in Draper City.

Television

Draper is part of the Salt Lake City DMA and is covered by KSL, FOX13, KUTV, and KTVX.

Education
The portion in Salt Lake County is in the Canyons School District.

The portion in Utah County is in the Alpine School District.

Notable people 
 Dia Frampton (born 1987), singer-songwriter; born in Draper
 Kendall D. Garff (1906–1997), businessman; born in Draper
 Cody Larsen, American football player
 Tyler Larsen, American football player
 George W. Latimer (1900–1990), lawyer; born in Draper
 Andy Phillips (born 1989), football placekicker; born in Draper
 Lauritz Smith (1830–1924), Mormon leader and one of Draper's founders
 Wilson W. Sorensen (1916–2009), president of Utah Technical College; born in Draper
 Douglas R. Stringfellow (1922–1966), one-term congressman; born in Draper
 Kealia Ohai Watt (born 1992), soccer player; born in Draper
 Zach Wilson (born 1999), American football quarterback

See also

 List of cities and towns in Utah

References

External links

 

 
Cities in Utah
Salt Lake City metropolitan area
Provo–Orem metropolitan area
Populated places established in 1849
1849 establishments in the State of Deseret
Cities in Salt Lake County, Utah
Cities in Utah County, Utah
Mormon Road